Eliahu Sacharoff (1914–October 30, 2018) was a member of the Haganah who, on 8 October 1943, was sentenced by a military court in the British Mandate of Palestine to seven years' imprisonment after being found guilty of possessing more ammunition than his firearm license allowed.

The mayor of Tel Aviv gave evidence as a defence witness said that he approved of the Haganah as a defensive organization to protect life and property.

According to the president of the court, W. Russell Lawrence, Sacharoff was tried and convicted under Regulation 8C (b) Emergency Regulations, 1936 (as amended) for being in possession of two rounds, one of which was of a special kind stolen from a consignment delivered to the Suez docks in February 1943. According to this account, documents in Sacharoff's possession showed him to be directly linked to the conspirators who had carried out the theft.

References
'Illegal Arms' Sentence In Palestine', The Times, Saturday, 9 October 1943; p. 3; Issue 49672; col D.
'Eliahu Sacharoff' (Letters to the Editor), W. Russell Lawrence, The Times, Saturday, 6 October 1945, p.. 5; Issue 50266; col D.

Haganah members
1914 births
2018 deaths